Sarmi Regency is one of the regencies (kabupaten) in Papua Province of Indonesia. It was formed from the western districts then within Jayapura Regency with effect from 12 November 2002. It covers an area of 18,034.0 km2, and had a population of 32,971 at the 2010 Census and 41,515 at the 2020 Census; the official estimate as at mid 2021 was 41,849. The regency's administrative centre is at the town of Sarmi.

Sarmi is named from an acronym of the five main tribes, which are Sobey, Armati, Rumbuai, Manirem, and Isirawa. The five tribes do not represent the overall tribal diversity in this regency which has 87 tribes, each with their own language.

Demographics
The majority of Sarmi residents are native Papuans, with significant numbers of transmigrants from Java, Bali, Madura.

Religion
The majority religion adopted by the Sarmi community is Christianity, with a significant presence of Islam brought by transmigrants from Java and Madura, as well as a small minority of Hindus and Buddhists from Bali.

Christianity (76.94%)
Protestantism (74.74%)
Catholicism (2.20%)
Islam (22.96%)
Hinduism (0.05%)
Buddhism (0.05%)

Ethnic
Sarmi is inhabited by Sobey, Armati, Rumbuai, Manirem, and Isirawa who are native Papuans and migrants from other parts of Indonesia, especially Javanese, Madurese, Batak, Minangkabau, Bugis etc.

Culture
Long before European explorers landed on the northern coast of Papua, since prehistoric times the region had been in contact with various foreign cultures.  About 3,000 years ago, Austronesian speakers migrated to the northern coast of Papua.

They made and used boats adapted for sea voyages, they were the ones who managed to find an outrigger system (balance on the left and right of the boat) to deal with the fierce waves of the ocean.

Administrative Districts
At the 2010 Census, Sarmi Regency comprised ten districts (distrik), but subsequently nine additional districts (Sungai Biri, Veen, Bonggo Barat, Ismari, Sobey, Muara Toy, Verkam, Apawer Hilir and Apawer Tengah) have been created by splitting existing districts. These nineteen districts are tabulated below with their areas and their populations at the 2010 Census and the 2020 Census, together with the official estimates as at mid 2021. The table also includes the locations of the district administrative centres, the number of villages (rural desa and urban kelurahan) in each village, and (for the districts established before 2010) the post codes.

Notes: (a) including the offshore islands of Pulau Masimasi, Pulau Wakde Besar, Pulau Wakde Kecil, Pulau Yamna Besar and Pulau Yamna Kecil. (b) the 2010 population of this new district is included with the figure for the district(s) from which it was subsequently cut out. (c) including the offshore islands of Pulau Anus, Pulau Yersun, Pulau Podena, Pulau Mengge and Pulau Kaycebo. (d) the 2010 population of this new district is included with the figure for Bonggo District, from which it was subsequently cut out. (e) including the offshore islands of Pulau Armo, Pulau Kosong, Pulau Liki and Pulau Sawar.

References

External links
Statistics publications from Statistics Indonesia (BPS)

Regencies of Papua (province)